Ralph van Deusen (born May 13, 1976) is a Dutch screenwriter.

Biography 
Ralph van Deusen attended Utrecht University and Hogeschool Sint-Lukas Brussel where he studied audiovisual Arts. In 1996 he moved to Los Angeles. Due to an illness in his childhood, Ralph van Deusen suffers of Aphasia. He makes his living working as a screenwriter and ghostwriter.

Filmography 
 My Mother's Messias (1996)
 Target: Teacher (1997)
 The Secret (1999, Director: Dani Levy)
 Highway from Hell (2002, Director: Xavier Koller, Production Company: Condor Films)
 Pilots (2006, Director: Thomas Gerber)

External links 
 
 EDI Filmprize 2006

1976 births
Living people
Dutch screenwriters
Dutch male screenwriters